Air Vice Marshal Robert Norman Bateson  (10 June 1912 – 6 March 1986) was a Royal Air Force (RAF) pilot during the Second World War who flew extreme low-level raids against precision targets in occupied Europe. He started life in the English town of Watford, where he attended the local grammar school from 1914 onwards. Post-war he became a senior RAF officer.

Military career

Second World War
Bateson joined the Royal Air Force in July 1936. After initial flying training, Bateson was granted a short service commission as an acting pilot officer in September 1936. He completed his RAF flying training in May 1937 and in June joined No. 113 Squadron RAF at RAF Upper Heyford where he initially flew the Hawker Hind. His squadron moved to RAF Grantham a few months later.

The squadron was one of several RAF units sent to Egypt and the Middle East in mid-1938. Based at RAF Heliopolis, the squadron was among the last in the Middle East to convert to the Bristol Blenheim bomber, in June 1939. Bateson later took command of the squadron, from September 1940 to January 1941, in operations against Italian forces in Libya.

In January 1942, Bateson took command of No. 211 Squadron RAF in Egypt. The squadron was one of several sent to the Far East after Japan entered World War 2. Flying from airfields in Sumatra and Java, the squadron suffered heavy losses to Japanese forces. Bateson, with other officers and men of 211 Squadron, was among RAF survivors evacuated to Australia in early March 1942. From May 1942, he was posted to command No. 11 Squadron RAF in Ceylon.

Bateson returned to the United Kingdom in mid-1943 and from February 1944 took over the command of No. 613 (City of Manchester) Squadron RAF. Equipped with De Havilland Mosquito FB.VI fighter bomber aircraft, the squadron was one of several in No. 2 Group RAF responsible for low level precision attacks, among them strikes against Gestapo Headquarters in, for example, The Hague (the Central Records Registry attack of 11 April 1944) and Copenhagen (the Operation Carthage attack on 'Shell House' of 21 March 1945).

Post-war
Bateson continued to serve in the RAF after the war, rising to the rank of air vice marshal in January 1960. From February 1963 he was Senior Air Staff Officer, HQ Fighter Command, the posting from which he retired on 1 August 1967.

Honours and awards
Citation for the award of the Distinguished Flying Cross to Acting Squadron Leader Robert Norman Bateson (39054), No. 113 Squadron.

Citation for the award of the Distinguished Service Order to Acting Wing Commander Robert Norman Bateson, DFC (39054), No.613 Squadron.

Citation for the award of a Bar to the Distinguished Service Order to Acting Group Captain Robert Norman Bateson, DSO, DFC.

Award of Companion of the Most Honourable Order of the Bath (CB) to Air Vice-Marshal Robert Norman Bateson, DSO, DFC in the 1964 New Year Honours.
Award of Airman's Cross to Wing commander Robert Norman Bateson (39054), No.613 Squadron.

References

External links
Biography of Bateson

1912 births
1986 deaths
Commanders of the Order of the Dannebrog
Companions of the Distinguished Service Order
Companions of the Order of the Bath
English aviators
Knights of the Order of the Dannebrog
People educated at Watford Grammar School for Boys
Recipients of the Airman's Cross
Recipients of the Distinguished Flying Cross (United Kingdom)
Royal Air Force air marshals
Royal Air Force pilots of World War II
Military personnel from Sussex